Restaurant Brands New Zealand Limited, trading as Restaurant Brands, is a New Zealand fast food company. Restaurant Brands currently operates and owns the master franchising rights for the Carl's Jr., KFC, Pizza Hut, and Taco Bell brands in New Zealand. Restaurant Brands operates most of New Zealand's stores for the brands they own rights to and provides management and support services to New Zealand's independent franchisees of the remaining stores. All stores are required to maintain the policy of the head international stores.

Such things are all KFC stores using chicken salt on fries, Locally sourced chicken. Since the first KFC arrived to New Zealand  20th August 1971 on  Manukau Road all flavours have remained the same throughout. No changes to flavours or processes are allowed unless they are rolled out internationally.

Pizza hut having a set weight for ingredients and layouts of how ingredients are to be placed.

Taco bell uses locally sourced fresh ingredients and all premixed seasonings to be provided

History
Restaurant Brands was formed to acquire shares in KFC and Pizza Hut from PepsiCo. It acquired KFC in 1989 and Pizza Hut in 1995. The company originally purchased 122 stores, 91 KFC stores, 46 Pizza Hut stores and 2 Joint KFC and Pizza Hut stores.

In 1997, it listed on the New Zealand Stock Exchange with an offer price of NZ$2.20.

In 2016, Restaurant Brands shares jumped 9.8 percent on the news that it had purchased New South Wales largest KFC franchiser, QSR Pty Ltd, for A$82.4 million in cash and scrip. As a result of this deal, QSR's vendor Copulos Group will gain a 4.9% shareholding in Restaurant Brands.

In March 2017, Restaurant Brands purchased 100% of the shares in Pacific Island Restaurants Inc, the sole franchisee of Pizza Hut and Taco Bell in Hawaii, Guam and Saipan, for US$105 million. This consisted of 45 Pizza Hut stores and 37 Taco Bell stores.

The Group came into a conditional agreement in December 2019 to acquire 70 stores in Southern California, USA, for $US73 million. The purchase consisted of 59 KFC stores and 11 combined KFC Taco Bell stores together with a head office facility. The purchase was conditional on Yum! approval and the assignment of property leases. After satisfying a number of conditions, including the approval from the franchisor, Yum! Restaurants International, the transaction for 69 stores was settled on 2 September 2020 in New Zealand (1 September in the USA).

The company experienced a decline in profits during the 2021–2022 inflation surge, due to rising food costs.

Brands

Current

KFC
KFC entered the New Zealand market in August 1971, with the opening of its first restaurant in Royal Oak, Auckland. By September 1973, KFC had opened nine restaurants - four in Auckand and one each in Hamilton, Rotorua, Wellington, Christchurch and Dunedin.

Restaurant Brands acquired the brand in 1989 after being publicly floated by PepsiCo. KFC is Restaurant Brands largest revenue earner; in the 2017/18 financial year, KFC contributed $320 million of Restaurant Brand's $421 million sales income.

Pizza Hut
Pizza Hut entered the New Zealand market in September 1974, with the opening of its first restaurant in New Lynn, Auckland.

Pizza Hut was acquired by Restaurant Brands in 1995 from PepsiCo. After the acquisition Restaurant Brands completely changed Pizza Hut from a dine-in business to a home delivery and takeaway operation. This was achieved by acquiring and rebranding the Eagle Boys chain in New Zealand.  The first Eagle Boys store was converted to a Pizza Hut in June 2000 and the last store was converted just 13 weeks later. The majority are now home delivery and takeaway outlets. Pizza Hut commenced selling a number of its smaller regional stores to independent franchisees in 2011.

Carl's Jr.
In 2011, Restaurant Brands acquired the New Zealand franchise for Carl's Jr. The brand commenced rolling out stores in late 2012 and now has nearly 20 stores in operation.

Taco Bell

Rumours of Taco Bell being introduced to the New Zealand market by Restaurant Brands began to surface in 2011. In 2013, Restaurant Brands hinted at the possibility of further expanding and introducing Taco Bell to New Zealand, saying it could be achieved within the next year or two. Speculations resurfaced in 2015 when a Taco Bell-branded sign appeared on a Ponsonby Road storefront.

Speculation of Restaurant Brands acquiring the New Zealand Taco Bell rights has risen after the announcement that the Auckland-based company had acquired a Hawaii-based fast food operator of the Taco Bell brand, among others, that operates in Hawaii, Guam, and Saipan. The company stated that the acquisition was not a prerequisite for acquiring the New Zealand rights, but rather a move that would give Restaurant Brands greater insight into the inner-workings of the brand.

It was reported on 18 April 2018 that Restaurant Brands had acquired the New Zealand franchise rights for the Taco Bell fast food brand, and is planning to open their first store in New Zealand in the "not too distant future." Chief Executive Russel Creedy reported that the company, based on sales at its Taco Bell stores in Australia and Hawaii, would open a store soon.  Creedy stated, in December 2017, that a trial store could be operational by the New Year. Radio New Zealand reported that the first store could be open by 2020.

Taco Bell opened its first New Zealand store, in New Lynn, Auckland on 12 November 2019, with a second store opening on Shortland Street in Auckland CBD on June 16 2020.

Former

Starbucks
Restaurant Brands secured the New Zealand franchise for Starbucks Coffee in 1998, opening the first Starbucks store in Parnell, Auckland, reaching 26 stores nationwide. In September 2018, Restaurant Brands announced that it would not be renewing its licensing agreements with Starbucks Coffee International, Inc. (SCI), and with the approval of SCI, sold all fixed assets and stock of its Starbucks stores to Tahua Capital Ltd for NZD$4.4m, with the completion of sale in October 2018.

Expansion

Australia
In 2002 Restaurant Brands expanded its operations overseas with the acquisition of 52 Pizza Hut stores in Victoria Australia. The Victorian operation ultimately proved unsuccessful, with Restaurant Brands exiting the Australian market entirely by early 2008.

References

Haynes, Peter and Fryer, Glenda. "Standard recipes? Labour relations in the New Zealand fast-food industry" in Labour Relations in the Fast-Food Industry, ed. Tony Royle and Brian Towers (Routledge, 2002)

External links
 

Catering and food service companies of New Zealand
Food and drink companies based in Auckland